Windrush Square (often referred to by its original name, Brixton Oval) is an open public space in the centre of Brixton, South London, occupying an area in front of the Brixton Tate Library. After changing its name to Tate Gardens, it was again retitled and given its current moniker in 1998. The square was renamed to recognise the important contribution of the African Caribbean community to the area, marking the 50th anniversary of the arrival of the HMT Empire Windrush. It was the Windrush that in 1948 brought to the United Kingdom from Jamaica the first large group of post-war West Indian migrants (almost 500), who on arrival were temporarily housed less than a mile away from Coldharbour Lane in Brixton.

The organization Black Cultural Archives is now housed at 1 Windrush Square in a Grade II-listed Georgian building, the former Raleigh Hall.

On 22 June 2017, the African and Caribbean War Memorial – devised by the Nubian Jak Community Trust as the United Kingdom's first national memorial to African and Caribbean service personnel who fought in the First and Second World Wars – was unveiled in Windrush Square.

Windrush Square is a pedestrianised open space. The land is protected from development as it was formerly part of Rush Common.

References

Squares in the London Borough of Lambeth
Brixton